Naum may refer to:

People

Given name
Saint Naum (c. 830–910), medieval Bulgarian writer and missionary
Naum (biblical figure) or Nahum, a minor prophet; or a figure mentioned in the genealogy of Jesus
Naum (metropolitan) (born 1961), Macedonian Orthodox metropolitan of the Diocese of Strumica
Naum Akhiezer (1901–1980), Soviet mathematician
Naum Babaev (born 1977), Russian entrepreneur
Naum Batkoski (born 1978), Macedonian footballer
Naum Birman (1924–1989), Soviet theater and film director
Naum Bozda (1784-1853), Serbian merchant and philanthropist
Naum Faiq (1868–1930), Assyrian nationalist
Naum Il'ich Feldman (1918–1994), Soviet mathematician
Naum Gabo (1890–1977), Russian sculptor
Naum Gurvich (1905–1981), Soviet-Jewish cardiac physician
Naum Idelson (1885–1951), Soviet astronomer
Naum Kleiman (born 1937), Russian historian of cinema
Naum Koen (born 1981), UAE-based Israeli-Ukrainian businessman
Naum Kove (born 1963), Albanian footballer
Naum Krasner (1924–1999), Russian mathematician and economist
Naum Krnar (died 1817), secretary to Karađorđe, the leader of the First Serbian Uprising
Naum Levin (born 1933), Ukrainian–Australian chess master and trainer
Naum Luria (1892–1966), later changed his name to Artur Luriye, or Arthur Lourié, Russian composer
Naum Meiman (1912–2001), Soviet/Israeli mathematician, physicist, dissident, and refusenik
Naum Miladinov (1817–1897), of the Miladinov brothers, Albanian folklorists
Naum Dhimitër Naçi (1871–1927), Albanian teacher and patriot
Naum Olev (1939–2009), Russian lyricist
Naum Panovski (born 1950), Macedonian theatre director and writer
Naum Prokupets (born 1948), Moldovan-born Soviet world champion sprint canoer
Naum Rogozhin (1879–1955), Soviet actor
Naum Sekulovski (born 1982), Australian soccer player
Naum Senyavin (c. 1680–1738), Russian Royal Navy officer
Naum Shopov (1930–2012), Bulgarian actor
Naum Z. Shor (1937–2006), Soviet and Ukrainian mathematician
Naum Shtarkman (1927–2006), Russian pianist
Naum Shusterman (1912–1976), Soviet engineer and Lieutenant Colonel
Naum Sluzsny (1914–1979), Swiss pianist
Naum Slutzky (1894–1965), Ukrainian goldsmith
Naum Sorkin (1899–1980), Soviet military officer and diplomat
Naum Terebinsky (1851—after 1908), Russian politician
Naum Tomalevski (1882–1930), Bulgarian revolutionary in the Macedonian revolutionary movement
Naum Torbov (1880–1952), Bulgarian architect
Naum Veqilharxhi (1797–1846), Albanian lawyer and scholar
Naum Ya. Vilenkin (1920–1991), Soviet mathematician

Surname
Anton Naum (1829–1917), Moldavian/Romanian poet
Dorothy Naum (1928–2008), American baseball player
Gellu Naum (1915–2001), Romanian poet
Said Naum (fl. 19th century), Muslim philanthropist in the Dutch East Indies

Other uses
Naum (chess), a chess engine
Naum Theatre, a theatre and opera house in Istanbul, Turkey, 1839–1870

See also
 Nahum (disambiguation)
 Naim (disambiguation)

Romanian-language surnames